West Virginia Route 211 is a north–south state highway located in and near Mount Hope, West Virginia. The southern terminus of the route is at West Virginia Route 16 in western Mount Hope. The northern terminus is at WV 16 and West Virginia Route 61 on the northern edge of Mount Hope.

History
All of WV 211 was once part of U.S. Route 21 prior to construction of the Mount Hope bypass.

Major intersections

References

211
Transportation in Fayette County, West Virginia
U.S. Route 21